Margaret of Savoy may refer to:

 Margaret of Savoy (d. 1254), daughter of Amadeus IV, Count of Savoy, and Anne of Burgundy; wife firstly of Boniface II, Marquess of Montferrat; and secondly of Aymar III, Count of Valentinois
 The Blessed Margaret of Savoy (1390–1464), Marchioness of Montferrat, and a Dominican Sister
 Margaret of Savoy, Duchess of Anjou, wife of Louis III, titular king of Naples; Louis IV, Elector Palatine; and Ulrich V, Count of Württemberg; mother of Philip, Elector Palatine
 Margaret of Savoy, Countess of Saint-Pol (1439–1483), daughter of Louis, Duke of Savoy, and wife firstly of John IV, Marquess of Montferrat, and secondly of Peter II, Count of Saint-Pol
 Margaret of Austria, Duchess of Savoy (1480–1530), daughter of Maximilian I, Holy Roman Emperor, and Mary of Burgundy; wife firstly of John of Castile and secondly of Philibert of Savoy
 Margaret of France, Duchess of Berry (1523–1574), daughter of Francis I, King of France, and Claude, Duchess of Brittany; wife of Emmanuel Philibert, Duke of Savoy
 Margaret of Savoy, Vicereine of Portugal (1589–1655), Duchess of Mantua and Montferrat and last Vicereine of Portugal
 Margherita of Savoy (1851–1926), queen consort of Italy, wife of Umberto I

See also
 Margherita di Savoia (disambiguation)